Justin's House is a children's television comedy show produced by the BBC for CBeebies. It stars host Justin Fletcher, his green Little Monster, and his humanoid general-purpose housekeeping robot Robert.

Format

Series 1-4
Justin's House was recorded as a stage series in front of an audience of children, and was filmed at Dock 10 studios in Manchester.

The show usually starts with Robert singing the "Dusting for Justin" song, before welcoming the audience to Justin's House. This is usually followed by Robert introducing the main theme of the episode, with the help of Little Monster. Justin then makes his entrance, usually through one of the doors in the house, then singing the "Wiggle your Bottoms" song. Justin's entrance usually ends up creating some mess, for instance in Series 3 Episode 17 he opens the door into Robert, which causes Robert to throw custard pies everywhere. Justin and Robert then sing the Justin's House song. The show always ends with Justin, Robert, and any special guests featured in that episode singing a song.

From Series 2 onwards there was a colourful staircase next to the front door; each step was a different colour. The staircase leads the upstairs balcony part of the set, which contains Justin's bed, wardrobe and bathroom. In addition, a zebra called Dave is introduced in the opening titles, who flies to Justin's House via hot air balloon and crashes into the wall, staying with his head permanently displayed at the back of the set.

Series 5
Series 5 features a brand new format and set. There is no Dave the Zebra, and Justin's house is newly redecorated. The upstairs cannot be seen, but instead, the characters can go out in the garden, and also into Robert's workshop, which can also be seen in Robert's Memory Download and Pie Cam (series 2). This season was recorded within a closed studio without a live audience and is more sitcom-based, due to COVID-19 restrictions.

The show usually starts with Robert, then Justin will come in, and together they will sing the 'Who's in the House?' song. The show, like in series 5, always ends with Justin, Robert, and any special guests that featured in that episode singing a song with Justin, Robert and Little Monster. There is normally a blast of Confetti at the end of a majority of episodes, but not every episode features it.

Transmissions
Five series of Justin's House have aired.

Series 1 contained 28 episodes and was broadcast in Autumn 2011.

Series 2 contained 25 episodes and aired in two-halves. Episodes 1 – 12 were broadcast on Thursdays and Fridays at 11:00am and 5:00pm from 25 August – 30 September 2012. Episodes 13 – 23 were broadcast on Thursdays and Fridays from 5 January – 9 February 2013. Episodes 24 and 25 were special episodes that contained highlights from the series. These were broadcast on 30 and 31 March 2013 respectively.

Series 3 contained 20 episodes and aired in two-halves. Episodes 1 – 10 were broadcast on Thursdays and Fridays from 18 October – 16 November 2014. Episodes 11 – 20 were broadcast on Thursdays and Fridays from 28 February – 29 March 2015. Episodes 18 and 20 were special episodes that contained highlights from the series.

Series 4 also contained 20 episodes and aired in two-halves. Episodes 1 – 10 were broadcast on Thursdays and Fridays from 8 October – 6 November 2016. Episode 11 was a Christmas special that was broadcast on 24 December 2016. Episodes 12 – 20 were broadcast on Thursdays and Fridays from 25 February – 25 March 2017. Episode 20 was a special episode that contained highlights from the series.

Series 5 also contained 20 episodes 

The show was renewed for a fifth series in November 2020, which premiered on 25 October 2021.

Characters

Main
 Justin Fletcher as a fictional version of Himself.
 Justin also portrays some of his other characters in some episodes, such as original characters Sir Justin-A-Lot of Mess, Justinardo de Stinky, Long Johns Justin, alongside Rapids Johnson from Gigglebiz and Mr Tumble from Something Special.
 Steven Kynman as Robert the Robot, Justin's housekeeping robot.
 Katherine Smee as Little Monster, a naughty monster who likes to cause fun and mischief in Justin's House.
 Smee also puppeteers Cousin Cuddle, Little Monster's cousin who is even more naughty than she is, and Auntie Monsterella, Little Monster's aunt.
 Jane Deane as Dee (Season 1), a unicycling delivery woman.
 Lena Kaur as Mac (Season 3), an explorer and Justin's new neighbour.
 Cat Sandion as Cat (Season 4-present), Justin's neighbour.
 Alex Phelps as Tom (Season 5-present)
 Sam Yetunde as Cherry (Season 5-present)
 Jack  Elton  as Jackson  (Season 6-present)

Guest Stars
The series also features many guest stars, ranging from existing CBeebies stars, to other personalities, who portray original characters made for the series or play themselves.

Episodes

Series 1 (2011)

Series 2 (2012–2013)

Series 3 (2014–2015)

Series 4 (2016–2017)

Series 5 (2021)
{{Episode table |total_width= |background=#FF6CA2 |overall= |title= |writer= |airdate= |episodes=

 |LineColor=FF6CA2

Home Media
Series 1 and 2 have been released on DVD by Dazzler Media, under license from the BBC.

}

References

External links
 

2010s British children's television series
2020s British children's television series
2011 British television series debuts
British preschool education television series
British television shows featuring puppetry
BBC children's television shows
CBeebies
Television series about monsters
Television series about robots
Television series by BBC Studios